This is a list of species in Ocyptamus, a genus of syrphid flies in the family Syrphidae.

Ocyptamus species

O. abata (Curran, 1938) c g
O. ada (Curran, 1941) c g
O. adspersus (Fabricius, 1805) c g
O. aeneus (Williston, 1891) c g
O. aeolus (Hull, 1943) c
O. amabilis (Hull, 1943) c g
O. anona (Hull, 1943) c g
O. anthinone (Hull, 1949) c g
O. antiphates (Walker, 1849) i c g b
O. arabella (Hull, 1947) c g
O. arethusa (Hull, 1949) c
O. argentinus (Curran, 1939) c g
O. ariela (Hull, 1944) c g
O. aster (Curran, 1941) c
O. attenuatus (Williston, 1891) c g
O. aurora (Hull, 1943) c g
O. banksi (Hull, 1941) c g
O. bassleri (Curran, 1939) c
O. bonariensis (Brethes, 1905) c g
O. braziliensis (Curran, 1939) c g
O. brevipennis (Schiner, 1868) c g
O. bromleyi (Curran, 1929) c g
O. calla (Curran, 1941) c g
O. callidus (Hine, 1914) c g
O. capitatus (Loew, 1863) c g
O. cecrops (Hull, 1958) c g
O. chapadensis (Curran, 1930) c g
O. colombianus (Curran, 1941) c g
O. confusus (Goot, 1964) c g
O. conjunctus (Wiedemann, 1830) c g
O. cordelia (Hull, 1949) c g
O. coreopsis (Hull, 1944) c g
O. crassus (Walker, 1852) c g
O. crocatus (Austen, 1893) c g
O. croceus (Austen, 1893) c g
O. cubanus (Hull, 1943) i c g b
O. cultratus (Austen, 1893) c g
O. cultrinus (Curran, 1939) c g
O. cybele (Hull, 1947) c g
O. cyclops (Hull, 1947) c g
O. cylindricus (Fabricius, 1781) c g
O. cymbellina (Hull, 1944) c g
O. debasa (Curran, 1941) c g
O. deceptor (Curran, 1930) c g
O. delicatissimus (Hull, 1943) c g
O. diffusus (Curran, 1939) c g
O. dimidiatus Fabricius, 1781 i c g
O. dryope (Hull, 1958) c g
O. eblis (Hull, 1943) c g
O. elnora (Shannon, 1927) c g
O. erebus (Hull, 1943) c g
O. exiguus (Williston, 1888) c g
O. fasciatus Roeder, 1885 c g
O. fascipennis (Wiedemann, 1830) c g b
O. ferrugineus Thompson, 1981 c g
O. fervidus (Austen, 1893) c g
O. fiametta (Hull, 1943) c g
O. filii (Doesburg, 1966) c g
O. filiola (Shannon, 1927) c g
O. filissimus (Hull, 1943) c g
O. flavens (Austen, 1893) c g
O. flukiella (Curran, 1941) c g
O. funebris Macquart, 1834 i c g
O. fuscicolor (Bigot, 1884) c g
O. fuscipennis (Macquart, 1834) i c g b
O. gastrostactus (Wiedemann, 1830) i c g
O. geijskesi (Doesburg, 1966) c
O. giganteus (Schiner, 1868) c g
O. gilvus (Austen, 1893) c g
O. globiceps (Hull, 1937) c g
O. gratus (Curran, 1941) c g
O. halcyone (Hull, 1949) c g
O. harlequinus (Hull, 1948) c
O. hippolyte (Hull, 1957) c g
O. hirtus (Shannon, 1927) c g
O. hyacinthia (Hull, 1947) c g
O. hyalipennis (Curran, 1930) c g
O. immaculatus (Macquart, 1842) c g
O. inca (Curran, 1939) c g
O. infanta (Hull, 1943) c g
O. infuscatus Bigot, 1884 c g
O. inornatus (Walker, 1836) c g
O. io (Hull, 1944) c g
O. iona (Curran, 1941) c g
O. iris (Austen, 1893) c g
O. isthmus Thompson, 1976 c g
O. johnsoni (Curran, 1934) c g
O. laudabilis (Williston, 1891) c g
O. lemur (Osten Sacken, 1877) i c g b
O. lepidus (Macquart, 1842) c g
O. leucopodus (Hull, 1948) c g
O. levissimus (Austen, 1893) c g
O. limpidapex (Curran, 1941) c g
O. lucretia (Hull, 1949) c g
O. luctuosus (Bigot, 1884) c g
O. lugubris (Philippi, 1865) c g
O. macer (Curran, 1930) c g
O. mara (Curran, 1941) c g
O. martorelli (Telford, 1973) c g
O. medina (Telford, 1973) c g
O. melanorrhinus (Philippi, 1865) c g
O. mentor (Curran, 1930) c g
O. micropelecinus (Shannon, 1927) c g
O. micropyga (Curran, 1941) c g
O. mima (Hull, 1949) c g
O. minimus (Hull, 1943) c g
O. murinus (Curran, 1930) c g
O. nasutus (Williston, 1891) c g
O. neoparvicornis (Telford, 1973) c g
O. neptunus (Hull, 1943) c g
O. nerissa (Hull, 1943) c g
O. nero (Curran, 1939) c g
O. neuralis (Curran, 1934) c g
O. nigrocilia (Hull, 1943) c g
O. niobe (Hull, 1943) c g
O. nitidulus (Curran, 1930) c
O. nora (Curran, 1941) c g
O. nymphaea (Hull, 1943) c g
O. obliquus (Curran, 1941) c g
O. oblongus (Walker, 1852) c g
O. octomaculatus Thompson, 1976 c g
O. oenone (Hull, 1949) c g
O. oriel (Hull, 1942) c g
O. ornatipes (Curran, 1927) c g
O. oviphorus (Hull, 1943) c g
O. ovipositorius (Hull, 1943) c g
O. panamensis (Curran, 1930) c g
O. pandora (Hull, 1942) c g
O. papilionarius (Hull, 1943) c g
O. para (Curran, 1941) c g
O. parvicornis (Loew, 1861) i c g b
O. peri (Hull, 1943) c g
O. philippianus (Enderlein, 1938) c g
O. philodice (Hull, 1950) c g
O. plutonia (Hull, 1948) c g
O. pola (Curran, 1939) c g
O. potentilla (Hull, 1942) c g
O. prenes (Curran, 1930) c g
O. princeps (Hull, 1944) c g
O. provocans (Curran, 1939) c g
O. prudens (Curran, 1934) c g
O. pullus (Sack, 1921) c g
O. pumilus (Austen, 1893) c g
O. punctifrons (Williston, 1891) c g
O. pyxia (Hull, 1943) c g
O. rugosifrons (Schiner, 1868) c g
O. saffrona (Hull, 1943) c g
O. sagittiferus (Austen, 1893) c g
O. salpa (Hull, 1944) c g
O. sappho (Hull, 1943) c g
O. sargoides (Macquart, 1850) c g
O. sativus (Curran, 1941) c g
O. satyrus (Hull, 1943) c g
O. schwarzi (Curran, 1939) c g
O. scintillans (Hull, 1943) c g
O. selene (Hull, 1949) c g
O. shropshirei (Curran, 1930) c g
O. signiferus (Austen, 1893) c g
O. simulatus (Curran, 1939) c g
O. smarti (Curran, 1939) c g
O. spatulatus (Giglio-Tos, 1892) c g
O. stenogaster (Williston, 1888) c
O. stipa (Hull, 1949) c g
O. stolo (Walker, 1852) c g
O. striatus (Walker, 1852) c g
O. subchalybeus (Walker, 1857) c g
O. summus (Fluke, 1936) c g
O. susio (Hull, 1941) c g
O. tarsalis (Walker, 1836) c g
O. tenuis (Walker, 1852) c g
O. tiarella (Hull, 1944) c g
O. titania (Hull, 1943) c g
O. trilobus (Hull, 1944) c g
O. trinidadensis (Curran, 1939) c g
O. tristani Zumbado, 2000 c g
O. urania (Hull, 1949) c g
O. vanda (Hull, 1943) c g
O. vanessa (Hull, 1949) c
O. variegatus (Macquart, 1842) c g
O. vera (Hull, 1943) c g
O. verona (Curran, 1941) c g
O. victoria (Hull, 1941) c g
O. vierecki (Curran, 1930) c g
O. virgilio (Hull, 1942) c g
O. wilhelmina (Doesburg, 1962) c g
O. willistoni Thompson, 1976 c g
O. wulpianus (Lynch Arribalzaga, 1891) c g
O. xanthopterus (Wiedemann, 1830) c g
O. xantippe (Hull, 1949) c g
O. zenilla (Hull, 1943) c g
O. zenillia (Curran, 1941) c g
O. zephyreus (Hull, 1947) c g
O. zerene (Hull, 1949) c g
O. zeteki (Curran, 1930) c g
O. zilla (Hull, 1943) c g
O. zita (Curran, 1941) c g
O. zobeide (Hull, 1943) c g
O. zoroaster (Hull, 1943) c g

Data sources: i = ITIS, c = Catalogue of Life, g = GBIF, b = Bugguide.net

References

Ocyptamus